This is a list of those who have served as President of the Republic of Peru (head of state and head of government of Peru) from its establishment to the present. The office was established by the Constituent Congress of Peru (1822), after the resignation of José de San Martín to his position as Protector of Peru and his subsequent departure from Peru. The first president was José de la Riva Agüero and the current president in office is Dina Boluarte, the first woman to hold the position. In the history of the position, there has been a series of political crises, caudillos, barracks revolt, civil wars, death of the incumbent, coups d'état, parliamentary attempts to remove the presidency, one autocoup, and vacancies dictated by the congress. The list is based on the work of the historian Jorge Basadre, constitutions, laws, and decrees in each case. Even though they were not presidents, the list includes the Libertadores José de San Martín and Simón Bolívar due to their historical relevance in the independence of Peru and its consolidation.

Presidents 
Political parties:

Far-right:   (Unión Revolucionaria, UR)

Right wing:    (Partido Civil, PC)    (Cambio 90/ Let's Go Neighbor)    (Partido Constitucional)   (Partido Democrático Reformista)  (Movimiento Democrático Peruano, MDP)

Centre-right:    (Peruanos Por el Kambio, PPK)

Centrist:  (Acción Popular, AP)  (Perú Posible, PP)   (Partido Morado, PM)

Centre-left:   (Partido Demócrata, PD)      (Partido Aprista Peruano, APRA)    (Frente Democrático Nacional)

Left wing:  (Partido Nacionalista Peruano; PNP)

Far-left:    (Perú Libre, PL)

Others:

Timeline from 1980

Addendum 
Those who are mentioned in the following list were sworn in as presidents of Peru, because of a political crisis, however, they never came to govern:

See also

Notes

References

Peru, List of Presidents of
List
Presidents of Peru, List of